Yeongyang Gim clan was one of the Korean clans. Their Bon-gwan was in Yeongyang County, North Gyeongsang Province. According to the research in 2000, the number of Yeongyang Gim clan was 7462. He was dispatched to Japan as an embassy, but the ship he rode was wrecked. Then, he was naturalized in Silla. He changed his name to Nam Min because he was given "Nam" from the region's name “Runan” as a surname from Gyeongdeok of Silla. Seok jung, a Nam Min's son, was settled in Yeongyang County and began Yeongyang Gim clan using the original clan's name Gim clan.

See also 
 Korean clan names of foreign origin

References

External links 
 

 
Korean clan names of Chinese origin